Sayem Alam (born 14 April 1993) is a Bangladeshi cricketer who plays for Sylhet Division. He made his first-class debut for Sylhet Division in 2009/10 National Cricket League on 14 January 2010.

See also
 List of Sylhet Division cricketers

References

External links
 

1993 births
Living people
Bangladeshi cricketers
Sylhet Division cricketers
People from Sylhet